XHOG-FM is a radio station on 101.7 FM in Ojinaga, Chihuahua. The station is owned by Grupo BM Radio and carries a grupera format known as La Primera.

History
XHOG began on AM as XEOG-AM 1260, awarded on January 6, 1959 to Ernesto R. Chapa Terrazas. In the 1960s, ownership passed to Sistema Radio Ranchito, S.A.

It migrated to FM in 2011.

References

Radio stations in Chihuahua